The Baptist Community of Congo (CBCO) is a Baptist Christian denomination in Democratic Republic of the Congo. It is affiliated with the Church of Christ in the Congo, and the Baptist World Alliance. The headquarters is in Kinshasa.

History

The Baptist Community of Congo has its origins in a British mission of the Livingstone Inland Mission installed in the Upper Congo River, in 1878, by the Baptist Welsh pastor Alfred Tilly. In 1884, the Livingstone Inland Mission was taken over by the American Baptist Missionary Union. In 1946, the Baptist Church of Congo is founded. In 2004, the organization takes the name of Baptist Community of Congo. In 2006, the denomination had 600 churches and 252,000 members. According to a denomination census released in 2020, it claimed 966 churches and 1,050,000 members.

See also 

 Bible
 Born again
 Baptist beliefs
 Worship service (evangelicalism)
 Jesus Christ
 Believers' Church

References

Baptist denominations in Africa
Evangelicalism in the Democratic Republic of the Congo